4in6 refers to tunneling of IPv4 in IPv6.

References

IPv6 transition technologies
Tunneling protocols
Network protocols